There are over 20,000 Grade II* listed buildings in England. As the county of Wiltshire contains 727 of these sites they have been split into alphabetical order.

Grade II* listed buildings in Wiltshire (A–G)
Grade II* listed buildings in Wiltshire (H–O)
Grade II* listed buildings in Wiltshire (P–Z)

See also
 Grade I listed buildings in Wiltshire